Piotr Wiśnik (born 6 August 1950) is a Polish football manager.

References

1950 births
Living people
Polish football managers
Znicz Pruszków managers
Polonia Warsaw managers
Hutnik Warsaw managers
Jagiellonia Białystok managers
Ząbkovia Ząbki managers